Lamont Randolph (born June 9, 1967) is an American former basketball player. He was a 2.00 m (6 ft 6 in) and 104 kg (229 lbs) small forward or power forward.

College career 
Randolph played college basketball with Tulsa for two seasons between 1988 and 1990. He averaged 12.3 points and 7.1 rebounds in 30.7 minutes per game for the Golden Hurricane.

Professional career 
Randolph made his debut in the Dutch Eredivisie with DAS Delft in 1990–91, averaging 20 points in 7 games. In the following season, he played with Red Giants Meppel where he averaged 25.8 points per game. From 1993 to 1996, Randolph played in the French second-tier LNB Pro B for Cean (1993–94) and Aix Maurienne Savoie Basket (1994 to 1996). From 1999, he played three seasons for Donar. In August 2002, he signed a short-term contract with Red Giants Meppel of the Dutch second-tier Promotiedivisie. The next years, Randolph would play for NAC Breda (2002–03) and Aris Leeuwarden (2004–05).

References 

Donar (basketball club) players

Aris Leeuwarden players
Red Giants (basketball club) players
Aix Maurienne Savoie Basket players
Caen Basket Calvados players
Dutch Basketball League players
American men's basketball players
People from New York City
Living people

1967 births

NAC Basketbal players
DAS Delft players